Gastrolactarius camphoratus' is a species of fungus native to the Pacific Northwest of North America. Initially described as Elasmomyces camphoratus in 1960, it gained its current name in 2004.

References

External links

Russulales